A Gandharva marriage (Sanskrit: गान्धर्व विवाह, gāndharva vivāha, IPA: [gənd̪ʱərvə vɪvaːhə]) (also known as love marriage) is one of the eight classical types of Hindu marriage. This ancient marriage tradition from the Indian subcontinent was based on  consensual acceptance between two people, with no rituals, witnesses or family participation. The marriage of Dushyanta and Shakuntala was a historically celebrated example of this class of marriage.

Etymology
In Hinduism and Buddhism, Gandharvas are male nature spirits and the masculine counterparts of the Apsaras. They are passionate lovers of women and arouse erotic and romantic passion in women.

History

The Smritis of Hinduism recognize eight types of marriage, one of them being Gandharva marriage. The other seven are: Brahma, Daiva, Arya, Prajapatya, Asura, Raksasa and Paisacha.

According to Apastamba Grhyasutra, an ancient Hindu literature, the woman chooses her own husband in Gandharva marriage. They meet each other of their own accord, consent to live together, and their relationship is consummated in copulation born of passion. This form of marriage did not require consent of parents or anyone else. According to Vedic texts, this is one of earliest and common forms of marriage in Rig Vedic times.

In Rig vedic opinions and classical literature, the commonly described marriage type was Gandharva, where the woman and the man had met each other in their ordinary village life, or in various other places such as regional festivals and fairs, begun to enjoy each other's company, and decided to be together. This free choice and mutual attraction were generally approved by their kinsmen. A passage in the Atharvaveda suggests that parents usually let the daughter freely select her lover and directly encouraged her in being forward in affairs of the heart. The mother of the girl thought of the time when the daughter's developed youth (Pativedanam, post-puberty), that she would win a husband for herself, it was a smooth and happy sort of affair with nothing scandalous and unnatural about it. The translated version of the Atharvaveda (Strikaratâni, ii.36) passage is:

May (Oh Agni!) a suitor after our own heart come to us;
may he come to this maiden with fortune;
May she be agreeable to suitors,
charming at festivals,
promptly obtain happiness through a husband.

As this comfortable cave (Oh Indra!) furnishing a safe abode
hath become pleasing to all life,
thus may this woman be a favourite of fortune,
well beloved,
not at odds with her husband!

Do thou ascend the full, inexhaustible ship of fortune
to bring hither to this woman the suitor who shall be agreeable to thee.
Bring hither by thy shouts (Oh lord of wealth!) the suitor –
bend his mind towards her.
Turn thou the attention of every agreeable suitor to her.

In Mahabharata, one of two major epics of Hindus, Rishi Kanva, the foster father of Shakuntala, recommends Gandharva marriage with the statement “The marriage of a desiring woman with a desiring man, without religious ceremonies, is the best marriage.” Elsewhere in Mahabharata (iii:190.36), the epic says “No man any longer asks for the daughter, nor does a father give away his daughter, they (women) find the man for themselves.”

Historic debate

Gandharva marriage over time became controversial, disputed and debated. Majority of ancient scholars discouraged it on religious and moral grounds. One argument found in the classical literature is that Gandharva marriage ignores the sacred rituals and vows the groom and bride must make to each other. Such a marriage, argued those ancient Vedic scholars, may or may not be lasting since it did not involve Agni. Over time, Gandharva marriages were either opposed or done with the use of Agni to ensure the longevity of the marriage through vows. 

Manu argued that Gandharva marriage is almost always the most suitable form of marriage. He goes on to state that Gandharva marriage is best suited for males who are priests, warriors, serving in the military, administrators, nobility and rulers. Baudhayana claims that it is the best type of marriage, as it is based on love and free will. Narada, yet another ancient scholar who wrote Nāradasmṛti sometime between 100 BC and 400 AD, suggests Gandharva marriage is best for everyone including the Brahmins. Calling it sadharna; Narada claims the only methods of marriage that are wrong are those that are based on abduction, forced, violence, fraud or purchase.

Decline

There is no consensus theory to explain why Gandharva marriages have declined over the ages. One theory claims that as prosperity and wealth increased, parents sought greater control of the activities and social life of their children. Pandey claims Hindu ideology shifted from diversity of marriage types to where the social pressures compelled the girl's family to seek arranged early marriages. Yet another theory is that the priestly caste of India, who officiated Brahma marriages and religious ceremonies, over time crafted rules that declared Gandharva marriage for most Hindus as inappropriate and disapproved (aprasasta), because traditional marriages were a source of their income, and Gandharva marriages made them poorer or obsolete.

Indian courts' perspective
In 1817, Gandharva marriages in India were ruled legal for some social groups by the Bengal Saddar Court.

In 1930, Justice Abdur Rahim held that the marriage in Gandharva form was not valid in India. This ruling came from the Madras High Court, with the statement that amongst the Hindus, the Gandharva form of marriage was obsolete (as of 1930). This was appealed based on the fact that the case was in court is proof that Gandharva weddings among Hindus is not obsolete.

In 1946, the Patna High Court in Kamani Devi v. Kameshwar Singh, ILR 25 Pat 58 = (AIR 1946 Pat 316) held that the relationship of husband and wife, created by Gandharva marriage is binding. The husband, the court ruled, cannot escape his responsibility of financially caring for his wife married in Gandharva form. The Patna High Court went further and held that the celebration of Gandharva form of marriage must be attended with nuptial rites and ceremonies including Homa (invocation before the sacred fire) and Saptapadi (the taking of seven steps by the groom and the bride together) for its validity. This ruling was cited in a decision by the Supreme Court in the case of Bhaurao v. State of Maharashtra.

In a 1974 case, Justice Mukherji noted, "Gandharva form of marriage should not be regarded as concubinage or quasi-marital union, more so in the context of the modern Society and in the background of the forward thinking of the present law givers. The possibility of legal validity of this form of marriage in the whole of India in near future even without being backed by custom, is too notorious to be ignored. In a sense, Gandharva form of marriage is trying to come back very fast (in India), pushing parental domination to the background."

Reemergence
In modern India, particularly in urban regions, Gandharva marriage is re-emerging. One term for couples choosing their own partners is 'love marriage' in India which usually means a couple choosing each other of their own accord but in most cases following it up with Hindu wedding  rituals. 

However, to that extent 'love marriages' do not fulfill the criterion of Gandharva marriage but the English term 'relationship' arrives at the closest co-relate wherein the parents', state's and religion's word is irrelevant.

References

Marriage in Hinduism
Marriage in India
Hindu wedding rituals
Gandharvas